Jim Elmer LaRue (August 11, 1925 – March 29, 2015) was an American football player and coach.  He served as the head coach at the University of Arizona from 1959 to 1966, compiling a record of 41–37–2.  LaRue played six seasons of varsity football at three different schools: Carson–Newman College (1942), Duke University (1943–1944), and the University of Maryland, College Park (1947–1949). He served as an assistant coach at the University of Houston, Wake Forest University, and with the Buffalo Bills and Chicago Bears of the National Football League (NFL). LaRue died on March 29, 2015 in Tucson, Arizona, aged 89, from undisclosed causes.

Head coaching record

References

External links
 

1925 births
2015 deaths
American football halfbacks
Arizona Wildcats football coaches
Buffalo Bills coaches
Chicago Bears coaches
Carson–Newman Eagles football players
Duke Blue Devils football players
Houston Cougars football coaches
Kansas State Wildcats football coaches
Maryland Terrapins football coaches
Maryland Terrapins football players
Utah Utes football coaches
Wake Forest Demon Deacons football coaches
People from Clinton, Oklahoma
Players of American football from Oklahoma